Bertrand T. Sperling (born 1950 in Brooklyn, New York) is an author and researcher. His books and studies on quality of life in America have made him "an internationally recognized expert on cities."

Work

Studies

Sperling is commissioned to carry out demographic studies which highlight a particular aspect of American life. Past studies have included "Funnest Cities to Live", "Best Cities for Singles", "Best Cities to Retire", and "Best Cities for Women’s Health".

Books

In 2004 Sperling released the 832-page Cities Ranked and Rated, co-authored by Peter Sander and published by John Wiley and Sons.  Sperling and Sander appeared on The Today Show in support of the book.

The 864-page Second Edition of Cities Ranked and Rated was published in 2007.

The 464-page Best Places to Raise Your Family was released in 2006 and again co-authored by Sander.

Bestplaces.net

Sperling's interactive "Places, U.S.A." computer program evolved into the Sperling's BestPlaces (BestPlaces.net) website.  Using quarterly-updated statistics from dozens of sources, the site is a free resource for people across the country seeking to relocate. The site is also used as a recreational learning tool and academic reference.

In popular culture
Sperling has been a guest  on the Today Show and featured in The New York Times. The results of his studies have been mentioned in "The Simpsons" animated TV show, "The Tonight Show", as well as in clues in the popular trivia game show "Jeopardy!"

Controversy
The Simpsons episode "They Saved Lisa’s Brain" (Season 10, Episode 22) generated controversy for its mention of East St. Louis, Illinois as America's least livable city.

In the episode, Comic Book Guy announces that Springfield is 299th on a list of the United States' 300 most livable cities.  East St. Louis is in last place.  A journalist for a "local East St Louis [news]paper" noticed this, and called writer Matt Selman to ask him why they were "taking a shot at East St Louis."  Selman jokingly replied: "because it's a crack-ridden slum."  The Simpsons staff received several angry letters from East St Louis' residents, demanding an apology.

Career
Sperling founded Dataccount  in the early 1980s, a company specializing in model-specific software for the emerging laptop market.  For example, he entered the United States Tax Code into programmable calculators, which were then used by tax professionals for estate planning.

Sperling was quoted  in the May 7, 1984 issue of InfoWorld magazine for this expertise on portable computer programming.  InfoWorld also turned to Sperling for his insight on the downfall of early laptop manufacturer Gavilan Computer in the magazine’s December 3, 1984 issue.

Sperling started Fast Forward, Inc. in 1984 and wrote an interactive software program called "Places USA."  It was the first application of its kind, allowing users to weigh their own criteria for what kind of lifestyle, amenities and demographic features were important for them.  It then used these criteria and weightings to produce a list of the user’s ideal place to live, from a pool of the 300 largest metropolitan areas (MSA’s) in the U.S.

An article featuring the "Places USA" program appeared in the newspaper USA Today.  In 1987 the editors of Money Magazine discovered his work and they commissioned him to compile their "Best Cities" lists. He continued to author these Money lists for nearly 20 years.

Sperling served as a consultant to author William G. Zikmund in the writing of the 1989 book Exploring Marketing Research.

The "Places USA" software application continued to be used by researchers as late as 1996, when William Seavey cited the program in his book Moving to Small Town America.

In Academia
 The 2010 paper "Music for the Seasons: Seasonal Music Preferences in College Students" by Terry F. Pettijohn II, Greg M. Williams and Tiffany C. Carter cited climate data from "Cities Ranked and Rated" (First Edition).
 A paper by Francisco Javier Carrillo, Alex Marin, and Ricardo Flores of the Tecnológico de Monterrey of Mexico presented at the Melbourne Knowledge Summit of 2010 entitled "Knowledge-based Development Metrics: Current Issues and Trends" takes a meta-view and compares Sperling's research to similar studies and rankings.
 A 2010 Auburn University graduate thesis by Karin L. Edenfield called "The Impact of Right-to-Work Laws on Interstate Cost of Living Differentials" examines living costs between forced-unionism states and right-to-work states.
 "Consumption Amenities and City Population Density" by Jordan Rappaport of the Federal Reserve Bank of Kansas City’s Economic Research Department (2006, revised 2008) explores correlation between population density and quality of life using data from "Cities Ranked and Rated" (First Edition).
 Jim Baird’s 2006 Department of Sociology thesis at Georgia State University entitled "Black Employment Opportunities: The Role of Immigrant Job Concentrations" cites "Cities Ranked and Rated" (First Edition) in considering black occupational concentrations and their relation to cost of living.

Quotes about Sperling
Richard Florida, professor at University of Toronto and head of the Rotman School of Management Martin Prosperity Institute said, "you need information based on life stage, job and a cluster and bundle of amenities, such as schools, health care, culture," adding that Sperling "tends to be good at assessing most, if not all, of that."

Thomas Wetzel, president of the Retirement Living Information Center in Redding, Connecticut believes the BestPlaces.net website is "the only one that does the comparisons people are looking for."

Data Sources
For the Bestplaces.net website, as well as the rankings in his books and media studies, Sperling uses a wide variety of data sources.  Most of this data is public domain and compiled by government organizations, providing objectivity and third-party accountability.

Sources include the U.S. Census Bureau, the FBI, the Centers for Disease Control and Prevention, the Bureau of Labor Statistics, the National Oceanic and Atmospheric Administration, and the U.S. Department of Health and Human Services.

Personal life
Sperling lived in Brooklyn for about a year following his birth. He grew up in San Diego, Oslo, Norway, Key West, Florida, and Carmel, California.

He graduated from Oregon State University in 1974 with a degree in Engineering. He was recently featured in an article in his alma mater’s alumni magazine.

After college Sperling moved to Portland, Oregon. He currently splits his time between Portland and Depoe Bay, Oregon. He has two adult sons with his wife Gretchen.

References

External links 
 Bert Sperling personal blog

American software engineers
1950 births
Living people
American male writers